Sergey Ivanovich Chumakov (1928—1994)  was a Soviet sprint canoer who competed in the early 1950s. He was eliminated in the heats of the C-2 1000 m event at the 1952 Summer Olympics in Helsinki.

References
Sports-reference.com profile

1928 births
Canoeists at the 1952 Summer Olympics
1994 deaths
Olympic canoeists of the Soviet Union
Russian male canoeists
Soviet male canoeists